Dangerous Voyage is a 1954 British mystery crime film directed by Vernon Sewell and starring William Lundigan, Naomi Chance and Vincent Ball. It was produced as a second feature for distribution by Anglo-Amalgamated. It was shot at Merton Park Studios in London. The film's sets were designed by the art director George Haslam. Location shooting took place in the English Channel and in Honfleur in France and Shoreham in Sussex. It was distributed in the United States by Lippert Pictures under the alternative title Terror Ship.

Synopsis
Author Peter Duncan investigates the circumstances of a damaged yacht and its crew who are taken under tow off the English coast and the subsequent disappearance of the crew before they reach land.

The mast is somehow radioactive and although replaced a geiger counter picks up a strong signal. When they try to find the old mast on the junk heap it has gone.

Cast
 William Lundigan as 	Peter Duncan
 Naomi Chance as 	Joan Drew
 Vincent Ball as John Drew
 John Warwick as 	Carter
 Jean Lodge as Vivian Bolton
 Kenneth Henry as Insp. Neal
 Beresford Egan as 	Hartnell
 Peter Bathurst as 	Walton
 Richard Stewart	as	Sgt. French
 Stanley Van Beers as Coroner
 Hugh Morton as Inquiry Chairman
 Armand Guinle as Fourneau
 John Serret as 1st. Gendarme
 Monti DeLyle as 	2nd. Gendarme
 Guy Standeven as Clerk of the Court 
 Oliver Johnston as Dr. Waverley

References

Bibliography
 Chibnall, Steve & McFarlane, Brian. The British 'B' Film. Palgrave MacMillan, 2009.

External links
 
 

1954 films
1950s mystery films
1954 crime films
British mystery films
British crime films
Films directed by Vernon Sewell
Merton Park Studios films
Seafaring films
Films shot in France
Films shot in West Sussex
1950s English-language films
British black-and-white films
1950s British films